Elena Riabchuk (born 27 July 1985) is a former pair skater who competed for Russia. She is the 2002 World Junior champion with partner Stanislav Zakharov. She was hospitalized for a couple of weeks in the summer of 2000 after her partner's blade struck her head while practicing a side-by-side spin.

Results 
(with Zakharov)

Programs 
(with Zakharov)

References

External links

Navigation

Russian female pair skaters
Living people
1985 births
Sportspeople from Kyiv
World Junior Figure Skating Championships medalists
Russian people of Ukrainian descent